Verkhnebureinsky District, Upper Bureya District, is an administrative and municipal district (raion), one of the seventeen in Khabarovsk Krai, Russia. It is located in the west of the krai. Its administrative center is the urban locality (a work settlement) of Chegdomyn. Population:  The population of Chegdomyn accounts for 47.5% of the district's total population.

The Bureinsky Nature Reserve, a protected area (zapovednik) is located in the district, covering the upper course of the Bureya River.

References

Sources

Districts of Khabarovsk Krai